The Banks Public Library serves Banks, Oregon, and is part of the Washington County Cooperative Library Services.

History
The library was established in 1976 by the Sunset Library Society, originally located in a bookmobile on city property. After sharing space in the Banks Junior High, it moved in 1988 to the Oak Village Shopping Center. In 1997, the library moved into a new facility, located on Market Street.

References

1976 establishments in Oregon
Banks, Oregon
Library buildings completed in 1997
Libraries established in 1976
Washington County Cooperative Library Services
Buildings and structures in Washington County, Oregon